Carpe Dementia is the third studio album by Luke Ski. Released in 1999, the album's artwork is a parody of Insane Clown Posse's Joker's Cards albums, the front cover illustration specifically parodying the cover of The Great Milenko. A song from that album, "House of Horrors", is parodied as "Rocky Horror".

Track listing
 "Fruit Loops" - 3:01
 Parody of "Footloose" by Kenny Loggins
 A song about breakfast, especially Froot Loops
 "Insane and the Brain" - 3:44
 Parody of "Insane in the Brain" by Cypress Hill
 A song about Animaniacs stars Pinky and the Brain
 This track is the same version that appeared on Luke's earlier album, Fanboys 'n Da Hood
 "Baby Got Brak" - 4:20
 Parody of "Baby Got Back" by Sir Mix-a-lot
 A song about the cast of Space Ghost Coast to Coast
 "Bart Simp Sun" - 4:33
 Parody of "Black Hole Sun" by Soundgarden
 A song about Sideshow Bob's obsession with the demise of Bart Simpson
 "Cornholio" - 1:47
 Parody of "Macarena" by Los Del Rio
 A song about Cornholio, the hyperactive alter-ego of Beavis from Beavis and Butt-head
 New studio recording for this album
 "Hill" - 2:59
 Parody of "Hell" by the Squirrel Nut Zippers
 A song about the TV show King of the Hill
 "Kenny Was A Kid From South Park" - 1:39
 Parody of "Jerry Was A Race Car Driver" by Primus
 A song about the TV show South Park
 "Macho Man (Oooh Yeah!)" - 3:09
 Parody of "Macho Man" by the Village People
 A song about professional wrestling, and "Macho Man" Randy Savage in particular
 "KramerCostanza" - 3:23
 Parody of "Intergalactic" by the Beastie Boys
 A song about the TV show Seinfeld
 "Titanic Monday" - 3:00
 Parody of "Manic Monday" by The Bangles
 A song about the movie Titanic
 Lead vocals provided by Amy Sienkowski
 "Back One Week To The Future" - 2:46
 Parody of "One Week" by Barenaked Ladies
 A song about the Back to the Future movie trilogy
 "Rocky Horror" - 4:26
 Parody of "House Of Horrors" by the Insane Clown Posse
 A song about the Rocky Horror Picture Show
 "Mystery Science Theatre Picture Show" - 4:39
 Parody of "Science Fiction/Double Feature" from the Rocky Horror Picture Show
 A song about Mystery Science Theater 3000
 New studio recording for this album
 "Men In Black (Klaatu Barada Nikto)" - 3:20
 Parody of "Where It's At" by Beck
 A song about the Men In Black series of movies.
 "You Might Be A Trekkie" - 5:10
 Spoken-word parody of the stand-up comedy piece "You Might Be A Redneck If…" by Jeff Foxworthy
 About the current state of fandom
 Recorded live at Gencon '98 in Milwaukee, WI, on August 8, 1998
 "What's Up Spock? (Deep Space '99 Remix)" - 4:47
 Parody of "What's Up Doc? (Can We Rock)" by Fu-Schnickens with Shaquille O'Neal
 A song about the first four live-action Star Trek TV shows
 "Resistance" - 2:58
 Parody of "The Distance" by Cake
 A song about the events of Star Trek: First Contact
 This track is the same version that appeared on Luke's earlier album, Shadows of the Bunghole
 "Star Wars Trilogy Homesick Blues" - 2:38
 Parody of "Subterranean Homesick Blues" by Bob Dylan
 A song about the first trilogy of Star Wars movies
 New studio recording for this album
 "Bad, Bad Boba Fett" - 3:05
 Parody of "Bad, Bad Leroy Brown" by Jim Croce
 A song centering on Boba Fett from Star Wars
 "Y.O.D.A." - 3:48
 Parody of "Y.M.C.A." by the Village People
 A song about Yoda from Star Wars and the training he gives to Luke Skywalker
 New studio recording for this album

The following tracks are hidden.  Tracks 21-26 don't contain much more than the title.

 Baa!
 Oh, gee, ya think?
 Anal!
 Hey! Hey! Where'n the Hell is the God damn buffet at?
 Heehahoohuh…
 Congratulations!
 "Quite A Man For An 'AL' Fan" - 3:09
 Parody of "Pretty Fly (For A White Guy)" by The Offspring
 A song about being a hard-core fan of "Weird Al" Yankovic

References

Luke Ski albums
1999 albums